Krahule is a village in Žiar nad Hronom District in the Banská Bystrica Region of central Slovakia. It is the only municipality in Slovakia that officially uses German along with Slovak.

History

The town was first mentioned in writing in 1331 as Blaufuß (literally "blue" + "foot") and was created by German miners as a Weiler.

Throughout its history, most of the area legally belonged to the Crown and the village was administered by a local judge. In 1601 there were 39 houses in the village. A 1640-year decree appointed Paul König as Judge, after the death of James König. The first chapel and the first school were built in 1788. In 1806 the Baroque-Classical style Roman Catholic St. John Nepomuk Church was dedicated. In 1828 there were 635 inhabitants, entirely German speakers, mostly local miners and farmers, in 57 houses. From 1895 there was a state funded Bobbin lace making school.

Over 1944 and 1945 many Carpathian Germans fled the advancing Soviet army and never returned. The Communist regime then renamed the town "Krahule" in 1948 and brought in Slovak settlers.

From 1980 to 1992 the town was a part of the Kremnica municipality.

In the 2001 census 35 of the then 144 residents indicated that they were Carpathian Germans (Karpatendeutsche). The Krahule municipality therefore adopted German as the second official language in addition to Slovak.

In the same census 89 people gave their religion as Roman Catholic. One person described himself as a Hussite, 21 residents reported to be without confession and 21 Protestant.

Today the town is a popular winter sports and hiking venue. Krahule is located directly above Kremnica on a high terrace about 880 feet in the Kremnické vrchy (Kremnitzer Bergen) mountains.

The current Mayor, or starosta, is Miroslav Schwarz.

Genealogical resources

The records for genealogical research are available at the state archive "Statny Archiv in Banska Bystrica, Slovakia"

 Roman Catholic church records (births/marriages/deaths): 1848-1945 (parish A)
 Lutheran church records (births/marriages/deaths): 1666-1895 (parish B)

See also
 List of municipalities and towns in Slovakia

References

External links
Surnames of living people in Krahule

Ski areas and resorts in Slovakia
Villages and municipalities in Žiar nad Hronom District